The following is a summary of Dublin county football team's 2020 season. It was a first season in charge for newly appointed Dublin manager Dessie Farrell. The season was suspended in March 2020 due to the COVID-19 pandemic. The season resumed in mid-October of the same year.

Competitions

National Football League Division 1

Table

Reports

Leinster Senior Football Championship

The draw for the preliminary rounds and quarter-finals was released by Leinster GAA on 7 October 2019. In a change to previous years' championships, a separate draw for the semi-finals was due to take place once the quarter-final ties had been played. However, due to the impact of the COVID-19 pandemic on Gaelic games and the resultant rescheduling of the 2020 All-Ireland Senior Football Championship, the draw for the semi-finals was made on 26 June 2020.

Fixtures

Bracket

All-Ireland Senior Football Championship

Notes

Management team

As of December 2020:
Manager: Dessie Farrell
Selectors: Shane O'Hanlon, Mick Galvin, Brian O'Regan
Coach: Darren Daly
Physiotherapists: James Allen, Niall Barry, Kieran O'Reilly
Analysis team: Stephen Behan, John Courtney, Frankie Roeback, Ciarán Toner
Kitmen: David Boylan, John Campbell
Performance development coach: Bryan Cullen
Media manager: Seamus McCormack
Goalkeeping coach: Josh Moran
Team doctors: Kieran O'Malley, Diarmuid Smith
Sports therapists: Richard Daly, Paul Donnelly
Nutritionists: Daniel Davey, Neil Irwin
Cameraman: Chris Farrell
Logistics: David Hendrick
Development gym coach: Shane Malone
Gym coach: Tommy Mooney
Performance consultants: Brendan Murphy, Seán Murphy

References

Dublin
Dublin county football team seasons